Newton was a 19th-century parliamentary electorate in Auckland, New Zealand. It existed from 1861 to 1893 and was represented by seven Members of Parliament.

History
Newton existed from 1861 to 1893. It was created for the 3rd New Zealand Parliament and ran to the end of the 11th Parliament, and was represented by seven MPs.

George Graham was the first representative, who was elected on 15 January 1861. The resulting  was won by Robert James Creighton. In the subsequent , Creighton successfully contested the  electorate. Swanson retired in 1884.

The 1887 election was contested by Joseph Tole (who had represented the Eden electorate since the 1876 election and was the Minister of Justice), Edward Withy (a political novice who, after early retirement from business, had emigrated with his large family to Auckland in 1884) and Henry Thomas Garrett.  Tole and Garrett were liberal politicians, whilst Withy was a conservative.  The liberal vote was split, and Tole, Withy and Garrett received 606, 701 and 170 votes, respectively, with Withy thus elected.

A deputation requested Sir George Grey to contest the 1891 by-election. Goldie also asked Grey to take his seat. Grey was prepared to put his name forward only if the election was unopposed, as he did not want to suffer the excitement of a contested election. Grey declared his candidacy on 25 March 1891. On 6 April 1891, he was declared elected, as he was unopposed.

The electorate was abolished in 1893 at the end of the 11th Parliament.

Members
Key

Election results

1891 by-election

1890 election

Notes

References

Historical electorates of New Zealand
Politics of the Auckland Region
1860 establishments in New Zealand
1893 disestablishments in New Zealand